Andrew Conrad De Silva (born 23 November 1974)  is an Australian R&B and Rock music singer. He was a member of the band CDB from 1993 to 1998, when he left to undergo treatment for cancer. De Silva won Australia's Got Talent in 2012, which included a cash prize of $250,000.

Early life
De Silva was born in Melbourne into a family originally from Sri Lanka.

Career

1991–1999: CDB 

Andrew De Silva formed CDB with Brad Pinto and Gary Pinto. Between 1991 to 1999, the group released two studio albums and won an ARIA Music Award. They disbanded in 1999.

2004-present: Solo career and Boom Crash Opera
In 2005, De Silva released his debut solo single, "Just Like Good Music", which peaked at number 33 on the ARIA Charts.

In 2012, De Silva auditioned for and won season 6 of Australia's Got Talent.

In 2013, Andrew De Silva was the support act for Mariah Carey at Etihad Stadium & Allphones Arena.

In 2014, Andrew was presented with the Award for Media & Entertainment by the Sri Lankan Association of Australia.
Also in 2014 at the Serendib awards, De Silva was presented with the Lifetime Achievement Award.

De Silva was a judge for the Miss Sri Lanka Online contest in 2012.

In September 2014, he released an EP Now That I Believe.

In 2016, Andrew De Silva was announced as the new lead singer of Australian group Boom Crash Opera.

In November 2016, De Silva gathered some of Australia's finest musicians to create a "Purple Revolution: A Tribute To Prince" tour.

Discography

Albums

Extended plays

Charting singles

References

Further reading

1974 births
Australian people of Sri Lankan descent
Australia's Got Talent winners
People from Melbourne
Living people
Sinhalese singers
21st-century Australian singers
21st-century Australian male singers